Ethmia rothschildi is a moth in the family Depressariidae. It is found in Romania and Russia.

References

Moths described in 1912
rothschildi
Moths of Europe